Maity or Maiti (माइति)(মাইতি) is a Indian surname belonging to the forward caste, used by the Mahishya and Bengali Kayastha community of Indian state  West Bengal. In addition, Maity or Maiti last name pertains to the Karan or Karana or Karan Kayastha community of Odisha in India. The community spreads across the borders of the state of Odisha and West Bengal. Karanas are a community of scribes.

Notable people with the surname include:
 Abha Maiti, (born 1925), Indian politician
 Iris Maity, (born 1958), Indian model and actress
 Paresh Maity (born 1965), Indian painter
 Somenath Maity (born 1960), Indian artist
 Tapan Maity, Indian footballer
 Aritra Maity (born 2001), Indian dancer